BBC Radio Jersey (Jèrriais: BBC Radio Jèrri) is the BBC's local radio station serving the Bailiwick of Jersey. It broadcasts on FM, AM, DAB+, Freeview and via BBC Sounds from studios on Parade Road in Saint Helier. Like other BBC enterprises in Jersey, funding comes primarily from television licence fees collected in Jersey. 

According to RAJAR, the station has a weekly audience of 23,000 listeners and a 10.0% share as of December 2022.

History

The station first aired on 15 March 1982, when it was opened by George Howard, the then chairman of the BBC. The first voice to be hear was that of Peter Gore who was one of the four-person start-up team headed by Mike Warr. It launched from Broadcasting House, just off Rouge Bouillon in St Helier, and moved to its present premises in Parade Road in March 1994.

Roger Bara, a long-standing breakfast show presenter, retired in 2012.

In recent years, local output has been reduced to eight hours on weekdays, coinciding with an increase in regional programming shared with sister station BBC Radio Guernsey.

In addition to its FM and AM frequencies, the station also broadcasts on Freeview TV channel 719 and streams online via BBC Sounds. Transmissions on digital radio began on 1 August 2021 with the launch of the Channel Islands DAB multiplex, on which BBC Radio Guernsey also broadcasts, alongside BBC Radio Jersey Xtra, a part-time stream carrying the station's AM opt-out content (chiefly parliamentary coverage), and a similar opt-out for Radio Guernsey. The stations are the first BBC stations to use the DAB+ standard - at the time of launch, all stations on the BBC National DAB multiplex, and all other BBC Local Radio stations on the UK mainland, used the earlier DAB format.

Location

The radio station shares premises at 18–21 Parade Road in St Helier with BBC Channel Islands television news, and BBC Jersey's online services.

Programming
Local programming is produced and broadcast from the BBC's St Helier studios from 6am – 2pm on weekdays.

Regional programming for the Channel Islands, shared with BBC Radio Guernsey, airs from 2-10pm on weekdays, from 6am – 6pm and 8-10pm on Saturdays and from 6am – 6pm on Sundays.

Off-peak programming originates from BBC Radio Devon in Plymouth, BBC Radio Cornwall in Truro and BBC Radio Solent in Southampton.

During the station's downtime, BBC Radio Jersey simulcasts overnight programming from BBC Radio 5 Live and BBC Radio London. The station also uses its AM frequencies to simulcast 5 Live on weekday evenings and Saturday afternoons for sports coverage.

See also
Mass media in Jersey
Channel 103
Contact 94

References

External links
 
 BBC Jersey

Jersey
Radio stations in Jersey
Radio stations established in 1982
1982 establishments in Jersey